Price's Patent Candles, founded in 1830, is an importer and retailer of candles. The firm is headquartered in Bedford in England, and holds the Royal Warrant for the supply of candles. It is today the largest candle supplier in the United Kingdom, and the company holds an important place in the technological history of candle making.

History
In 1830 a middle-aged Scotsman living in London was considering his business future. He was no stranger to commercial failure. As a young man in Scotland he had seen the collapse of his father's iron works in 1812 during the economic slump of the Napoleonic Wars. He had then travelled south to London and set himself up as a successful merchant in the 'Russia trade', importing goods from Moscow and Saint Petersburg. Now at the age of 58 William Wilson was approached by his partner with an invitation to go into a new venture: candle manufacture.

Perhaps it was William's familiarity with the Russian tallow trade that had suggested the idea. Tallow, a purified form of beef or mutton fat, was the only cheap available alternative to beeswax for making candles at this time. But if William was already familiar with the candle trade, he must have paused for thought. Candle manufacture had barely progressed since the Middle Ages. The wealthy and the Church burned beeswax candles, everyone else used the cheaper tallow lights which smoked, smelled and guttered. The poor either made their own tallow dips from hoarded animal fat with rush wicks – known as 'rushlights' – or lived in darkness.

Royal Warrant
By 1840 the perfect product was ready for Queen Victoria's wedding. It was traditional for every loyal household to burn a candle in its front room window on the evening of the monarch's wedding, and in London on 20 February most people lit one of Price's new stearin 'composite' candles made from a mixture of refined tallow and coconut oil.

Price's Patent Candle had long had a close association with the Royal Family. From the earliest days when the launch of their new composite candle coincided with the wedding of Queen Victoria and Prince Albert, there had been an ongoing Royal connection. Price's Patent Candle has held the Royal Warrant – either in its own name or through its subsidiaries Francis Tucker and Charles Farris – since the 1850s. Today it holds the Royal Warrant in its own name for Her Majesty the Queen of the United Kingdom. The company's special status as Warrant Holder means that it supplies candles for all Royal state occasions – coronations, weddings, lyings-in-state and funerals.

Innovations

Technological
There was a potential market in England for a mid-priced candle that gave a brighter cleaner light than tallow but was not as expensive as beeswax. What William Wilson and his partner discovered in 1830 was a new raw material and a scientific process that would allow them to manufacture such a candle. The firm they set up, Edward Price and Co, would make candles from coconut! Wilson took out a licence on an 1829 patent for the hydraulic separation of coconut fats, the partners built a candle factory at Vauxhall on the Thames in South West London, a crushing mill just up river at Battersea and invested in 1,000 acres of coconut plantation in Sri Lanka. The initial results were not that impressive, but the infant company had a couple of good breaks: in 1831 candle tax was abolished and by 1835 it had developed better chemical processes to obtain solid fats.

In the 1820s a French chemist, Michel Eugène Chevreul, had published his researches into fatty acids. By mixing a strong alkali with vegetable or animal fats he discovered that the solution separated into liquid and solid components. This technique, known as saponification, was already used by soap makers, but nobody had employed it for candle manufacture. William Wilson's son, George, experimented with this process; by adding a further distillation using a vacuum or high pressure steam he improved Chevreuil's basic chemistry. Price's were now able to refine tallow and vegetable oils to produce a harder, pure white fat known as stearin. Candles made from this burned brightly without smoke or smell. The same chemistry could also be applied to a range of unsavoury raw materials that had previously been unusable – skin fat, bone fat, fish oil and industrial waste greases could all be rendered into hard white candles.

Another of George Wilson's innovations allowed Price's to exploit a second overlooked tropical product. Palm oil, extracted from the palm nut was harvested and processed in West Africa. Soap makers were already using the oil but its dark orange-brown colour made it unattractive for candle-making. George devised a process for cleaning palm oil with sulfuric acid and a new cheap source of fat was available. There was an additional advantage to using palm oil. The region that produced the oil - the present day Ghana, Nigeria and Togo – was also the centre of the African slave trade. Slavery had been abolished in Britain and its colonies by 1833, but a huge and lucrative market for African slaves continued in the United States, Brazil and Arabia. Palm oil provided an economic alternative to that slave trade and was actively encouraged by the British government. Slavery had become immensely unpopular in Britain and 'politically correct' products like Price's palm oil candles and non-slave produced sugar were very popular. In 1847, when Edward Price and Co became Price's Patent Candle, the new joint stock company considered its ethical use of palm oil so significant that it became the basis for the company's seal which depicted Africans bringing calabashes of palm oil to a seated Britannia figure under a palm tree.

Labour
In 1840 the company employed 84 staff; by 1855, with two factories in London and one in Bromborough Pool, this figure had risen to 2,300 of whom 1,200 were boys. To any Victorian factory owner child labour was logical and attractive: it was cheap, flexible and in some cases carried out intricate tasks that adults were incapable of. At Price's Patent Candle nightlights and candle packaging were "turned out by the deft fingers" of its child employees. But if there was a single issue that enraged the British public as much as slavery did, it was factory child labour. Unusually for an employer Price’s shares these concerns. The Wilsons were a deeply religious family. William had worked for the London Missionary Society in his youth and his son James was an earnest and evangelical Christian. James was so concerned for the well-being of his child employees that in 1849 he had set up a Christian society at the factory. Each boy was given his "own drawer with lock and key in which to keep his own testament, prayer book, hymn book, arithmetic book, slate and copy book". Boys were encouraged to attend a religious service in the factory in the morning and to go to the factory school in the evening; they were rewarded with games of cricket and outings in the summer. James's religious and education programme was radical for its time - it was most unusual for a factory owner to be treating his workers in such a way. Other examples of this attitude were the free breakfasts and suppers for night shift workers and warm baths for the boys.

Price's benevolent attitude was an enduring one that continued beyond the Wilson family. The company sought to build good quality housing for its workers in London but could not buy any land. However, the Wirral factory at Bromborough Pool – "our colony on the Mersey"  – was a green field site. Here Price's eventually built a village of 147 houses with church, institute, shop and library for its workforce of "come downs" (the Battersea families who migrated to the new factory). This model village was an inspiration to other employers and was copied at Lever's Port Sunlight factory adjacent to Bromborough in the 1880s and by Cadbury's Bourneville village in the 1890s. Other examples of the company's far-sighted approach to its employees included the introduction of a profit sharing scheme for all staff in 1869 and a contributory employees' pension in 1893 - the first scheme in the country to include floor workers.

Lubricant
William Wilson's other son, George, had become company chemist and with his assistant George Gwynne was responsible for many of these new chemical processes. The company acquired a reputation for innovation and it generally had first refusal to work any newly patented inventions. As well as industrial chemistry there was the development of mass production processes. In 1849 they installed a system that moved candle moulds round the factory on a railway. By 1864 a new method of ejecting candle from moulds using compressed air pushed candle production to 14 tons a day. A decade later increased mechanisation enabled Price's Patent Candle to produce 32 million nightlights a year and dominate that market.

Price's Patent Candle processes for producing stearin gave them a distinct commercial edge over those competitors who were still making ordinary tallow candles. However there was a problem: the saponification and distillation processes that Price's Patent Candle used required two and a half times the quantity of raw material. Unless they could find a way of using the waste products a stearin candle would remain twice as expensive to produce as an ordinary tallow one.

One of the product separated out by saponification was a liquid fat called oleine, was separated from the stearin by compression. Wilson discovered that it could be used as a light lubricating oil and successfully marketed it to English woollen and cotton manufacturers as a cloth oil for mechanical looms where it quickly replaced olive oil. This was the first of a whole new range of lubricating oils that Price's Patent Candle would go on to develop. By experimenting with the heavy waste oil and by blending these mineral oils with animal and vegetable oleines, Price's Patent Candle developed a range of specific lubricants for rifles, sewing machines, bicycles, steam engines and gas engines.

For the first thirty years of the twentieth century Price's Patent Candle dominated this market; their Huile de Luxe and 'Motorine' were major products. As early as 1902 an attempt to drive to the South Pole was made using a car lubricated by Price's Oils as were, more successfully, the Norton motorbikes that won at Le Mans in the 1920s. Rolls-Royce were so impressed with the product that from 1906 and for thirty years after all their new cars were sold supplied with Motorine oil - the Rolls-Royce of lubricants for the Rolls-Royce of cars. In 1928 Price's Patent Candle received the Royal Warrant from The Prince of Wales for their motor oils.

Price's Candles Overseas

By 1900 Price's Patent Candle were producing 130 differently named and specified sizes of candle, any one of which could in theory be manufactured in 60 different permutations of material, colour and hardness; the company regularly held 2,000 different standard candle products in stock. Candles were created for every conceivable need: carriage candles, piano candles, dining-room candles, bedroom candles, servants' bedroom candles (that only lasted 30 minutes) photographic darkroom candles, "The Burglar's Horror!" nightlight (to be lit in every front and back window and guaranteed to scare off criminals) and candles for coal miners, navvies, engineers and emigration ships. To compete with other sources of light candles now needed to be sophisticated. Tapered Venetians, spirals, flutes and candles with self-fitting ends in many colours replaced the utilitarian white, cylindrical products of the mid-century. In the 1920s and 1930s Price's Patent Candle designed 'Art-Deco' candles and coordinated candlesticks as a luxury range and appealed to the growing children's market with Noah's Ark nightlight holders, birthday cake candles and a range of Walt Disney candle merchandise.

In 1910 Price's Patent Candle acquired its first overseas factories in Johannesburg and by 1915 the company owned six factories in South Africa, Shanghai and Chile. Price's Patent Candle went on to construct factories in Rhodesia, Morocco, Pakistan, New Zealand and Sri Lanka.

Price's Candles  Resurgence
After interlude as a public company Price's Patent Candles became a successful privately-owned business. Turnover increased five-fold between 1991 and 1998, the company is once again the largest British-owned candlemaker with over 300 employees. 
In 2001 Price’s Patent Candles relocated their headquarters to Bedford, Bedfordshire, incorporating a warehouse where they remain today. 2003 saw the acquisition of Price’s Patent Candle by the Italian owned company Sgarbi who in turn sold on to another Italian company SER in 2004. The majority of Price’s Patent Candle candle manufacturing is now done at SER’s headquarters in Turin with the sales and distribution both nationally and internationally still coordinated from Bedford.

In a consumer-led market where 80% of candle sales are now purely decorative, the company has focussed on new ranges of perfumed and essential oil candles and aromatherapy products. Price's Patent Candle design team, at the headquarters building in Bedford have stayed in touch with the London fashion scene.

References

External links
Price's Candles website

Candles
Retail companies of England
Chemical industry in London
History of the London Borough of Lambeth
History of the London Borough of Wandsworth
Retail companies established in 1830
1830 establishments in England
Companies based in the London Borough of Wandsworth